Kicking Stones is the fourth studio album by the Canadian country music singer-songwriter Johnny Reid. It was released on April 10, 2007, by Open Road Recordings. "Love Sweet Love", "Kicking Stones", "Darlin'", "Thank You" and "Out of the Blue" were released as singles.

Kicking Stones was nominated for a 2008 Juno Award for Country Recording of the Year. It has since been certified Gold by the Canadian Recording Industry Association for sales of 50,000 units.

"Darlin'" was previously recorded by Tom Jones as the title track of his 1981 album, Darlin'.

Track listing
"Out of the Blue" (Brent Maher, Brian Maher, Johnny Reid) – 2:58
"Love Sweet Love" (Jim Daddario, Thom Hardwell, Reid) – 3:28
"Thank You" (Hardwell, Reid) – 3:53
"Darlin'" (Oscar Stewart Blandamer) – 3:14
"Feelin' Alright Today" (Hardwell, Reid) – 4:34
"Which Way Is Home" (Brent Maher, Brian Maher, Reid) – 3:44
"What I Did for Love" (Brent Maher, Thom Schuyler) – 4:02
"That Kind of Lonely" (Jeremy Campbell, Reid) – 3:24
"To the End of the Road" (Hardwell, Brent Maher, Reid) – 2:54
"Kicking Stones" (Brent Maher, Reid) – 4:00

Personnel
 Chad Cromwell – drums, tambourine
 Eric Darken – percussion, tambourine
 Jim Drury – bagpipes
 Connie Ellisor – violin
 Carl Gorodetzky – violin
 Jim Grosjean – viola
 Vicki Hampton – background vocals
 Mike Haynes – trumpet
 Jim Hoke – harmonica
 Fats Kaplin – fiddle, violin
 Anthony LaMarchina – cello
 Tim Lauer – accordion, organ, piano, Wurlitzer
 Sam Levine – horn arrangements, penny whistle, saxophone
 Brent Maher – horn arrangements
 Gordon Mote – piano
 Don Potter – acoustic guitar, mandolin, slide guitar, background vocals
 Carole Rabinowitz-Neuen – cello
 Johnny Reid – lead vocals, background vocals
 Mark Selby – acoustic guitar, electric guitar
 Pam Sixfin – violin
 Liz Stewart – upright bass
 Ilya Toshinsky – acoustic guitar, mandolin
 Bergen White – string arrangements
 Glenn Worf – bass guitar

Chart performance

References

External links
[ allmusic ((( Kicking Stones > Overview )))]

2007 albums
Johnny Reid albums
Open Road Recordings albums
Albums produced by Brent Maher
Albums recorded at Metalworks Studios
Canadian Country Music Association Top Selling Canadian Album albums